Let's Talk About the Rain is a 2008 French comedy-drama film directed by Agnès Jaoui from an original screenplay by Jean-Pierre Bacri.  It takes its title from a song by Georges Brassens. Agnès Jaoui said in an interview that one day she was on her way to  a writing session with Jean-Pierre and had in her ears the song 'L'orage'  by Georges Brassens  which opens with the lines 'parlez-moi de la pluie, et non pas du beau temps.'

Plot
The film is a comedy of middle-class French life ' examining culture clashes, puncturing smugness, exposing fault lines, finding strength in romantic and familial relationships and discovering an underlying sadness that stops some way short of tragedy.'
 
The film is set in a small town in Provence during a rainy August. Following the death of  her widowed mother Agathe Villanova comes from Paris to deal with the sale of the home where she and her younger sister Florence were brought up, and to announce her entry into politics. She is the author of a feminist best-seller and a divorced film-maker Michel wants to make a TV documentary about her. Michel is having an affair with Agathe's sister. His collaborator is a young Algerian hotel clerk Karim, whose elderly mother has worked for most of her life as a servant with the Villanova family. Agathe's prejudice is put under the microscope when she records a series of interviews with Karim.

'The characters weave around each other for a week or so, occasionally colliding...everyone comes to have a better knowledge of themselves..the dialogue rings true..the ensemble acting is perfect..The film compares favourably  with the best of Éric Rohmer.'

Cast
 Jean-Pierre Bacri as Michel Ronsard 
 Jamel Debbouze as Karim 
 Agnes Jaoui as Agathe Villanova 
 Pascale Arbillot as Florence
 Guillaume De Tonquedec as Stéphane
 Frédéric Pierrot as Antoine

References

External links
 

2008 films
2008 comedy-drama films
French comedy-drama films
Films directed by Agnès Jaoui
2000s French films